Nevado Ojos del Salado is a dormant complex volcano in the Andes on the Argentina–Chile border. It is the highest volcano on Earth and the highest peak in Chile. The upper reaches of Ojos del Salado consist of several overlapping lava domes, lava flows and volcanic craters, with an only sparse ice cover. Numerous other volcanoes rise around Ojos del Salado.

Due to its location near the Arid Diagonal of South America, the mountain has extremely dry conditions, which prevent the formation of glaciers and a permanent snow cover. This is the highest lake of any kind in the world. Owing to its altitude and the desiccated climate, the mountain lacks vegetation.

Ojos del Salado was volcanically active during the Pleistocene and Holocene, during which it mainly produced lava flows. Activity was in two phases and a depression or caldera formed in the course of its growth. The volcano was also impacted by eruptions of its neighbour to the west, Nevado Tres Cruces. The last eruption occurred around 750 CE; steam emissions observed in November 1993 may have constituted another eruptive event.

An international highway between Argentina and Chile crosses north of the mountain. Ojos del Salado can be ascended from both countries, but the first ascent was made in 1937 by Jan Alfred Szczepański and Justyn Wojsznis, members of a Polish expedition in the Andes. During the middle of the 20th century there was a debate on whether Ojos del Salado or Aconcagua was the highest mountain in South America which was eventually resolved in favour of Aconcagua.

Name 

The name "" refers to a river that the 1937 Polish expedition used to reach the mountain, although the river Salado does not originate on Ojos del Salado and the name was already known before. Another theory posits that the volcano was named after mineral deposits on its flanks. There are two summits, known as the eastern or Argentine and western or Chilean summit; both lie along the international boundary and get their names after the country from which they can be more easily reached.

Geography and geomorphology 

Ojos del Salado is part of the High Andes and rises from the southern end of the Puna de Atacama, a high plateau next to the Atacama Desert with an average elevation of  metres. The border between Argentina and Chile runs across the summit of the mountain in east-west direction. The Argentine part is within Catamarca Province and the Chilean in Copiapo Province of the Atacama Region. The region is uninhabited and lacks water resources; many parts are only accessible through dirt roads.

It is the world's highest volcano and the second-highest summit of the Andes, and the highest summit in Chile. Ojos del Salado is not a single conical summit but a massif/complex volcano formed by overlapping smaller volcanoes, with over 20 craters. Basalt, gravel, pumice and scoria crop out in its rim, which is lower on the northern side. Reportedly, the summit is separated by a deep gap into two separate peaks. Thick short dacitic lava flows make up the core  area of the volcano but pyroclastic fall material covers much of the summit area.

The occurrence of a rift-like structure with numerous small craters has also been reported. Volcanic cones form a north-northeast trending alignment on the western flank. Cerro Solo and El Fraile are large lava domes on the flanks of Ojos del Salado, and produced pyroclastic flows.

Wind-driven erosion has produced megaripple sand fields on the northern flank. Above  elevation talus-covered slopes and lava flows form the bulk of the surface, while the vast desert plains begin below  elevation. The ground above  elevation is expected to contain permafrost, which is likely continuous at higher elevations and overlaid with a thin active layer. Cryoturbation landforms were not conspicuous according to Nagy et al. 2019, presumably because wind-driven phenomena overprint the effects of cryoturbation. Mass movements have left traces on the mountain.

Lakes 

Ojos del Salado hosts the highest lake in the world in the form of the crater lake in the summit crater. Fed by permafrost and snowfields, it lies at - elevation.

Ephemeral lakes occur at  elevation, when meltwater from permafrost accumulates in closed depressions. Such ponds may form in depressions at  elevation. Some of the lakes may be permanently frozen. Lakes might disappear with climate change owing to the breakdown of permafrost.

Surroundings 

The landscape is dominated by volcanoes, many of Pleistocene or Holocene age, and is the highest volcanic region in the world. Young volcanoes have conical shapes and often feature summit craters. Travellers have compared the region to a "moonscape". There are hot springs in the region, such as the Termas Laguna Verde at the shores of Laguna Verde, which are frequented by visitors.

This chain of volcanoes appears to be part of the Ojos del Salado-San Buenaventura tectonic lineament, which corresponds to a geographic (southern boundary of the Puna de Atacama) and tectonic discontinuity in the region. The lineament may be a consequence of the subduction of the Copiapo Ridge at this latitude. An alternative view is that the subducting Copiapo Ridge is actually located north of the lineament; this would be more consistent with the theory that the subduction of such ridges gives rise to gaps in the volcanic chain.

Ice and glaciers 
Except for firn and small glaciers in sheltered parts of the mountain, Ojos del Salado lacks substantial ice cover. This is due to the arid climate of the region, which causes the equilibrium line altitude of ice to rise above the top of the mountain and keeps most peaks in the area ice-free. Glacier areas shown on maps are often actually immobile firn fields. The ice reaches thicknesses of only  and areal extents of a few hundred metres. Meltwater feeds streams.

Climbing parties in 1956 reported two glaciers on the northwestern slope, a 1958 report indicated that an ice body at  elevation descends into two branches and is followed at lower elevation by another glacier also with two branches—but in neither case with any evidence of movement—and in 2014 there was ice in the summit crater and substantial glaciers on the eastern and southern slopes, which reached elevations below . There have been increases in ice area between 1974 and 1983 but between 1986 and 2000, ice area decreased by 40%. The melting of the ice is expected to produce an increased discharge at first, but eventually ice diminishes to the point that runoff will decline.

Penitentes are high ice spires which form when ice sublimates in the intense insolation.

Subsurface ice 

Ice buried beneath sand and encased in moraines is more important than surface ice at Ojos del Salado. It is retreating but the insulating effect of the cover slows the retreat. Cryokarst, erosional gullies and so-called "infilled valleys" have been observed; they most likely form when buried ice and snow melt. The combined effect of erosion by the meltwater and the disappearance of ice volume creates cavities that collapse and form the valleys and pseudokarst landforms. Pseudokarst landforms and dolines are other structures generated by the melting of buried ice.

Past glaciation 

Lateral moraines altered by wind erosion occur north of Ojos del Salado and some lava flows bear traces of glaciation. Research published in 2019 found cirques and U-shaped valleys on Ojos del Salado. However, there is no evidence of Pleistocene glacier advances in the region nor any indication of a Pleistocene snowline, although cirques have been reported from Nevado Tres Cruces and some sources propose the existence of glaciers 19,000 years ago. The monsoon reached farther south during the Pleistocene but did not reach Ojos del Salado, allowing the development of glaciers only at more northern latitudes. Westerly winds did not regularly influence the climate at the volcano, either.

Geology 

In South America, there are about 200 volcanoes with evidence of eruptions during the Pleistocene and Holocene along the western coast, where the Nazca Plate and Antarctic Plate subducts beneath the South America Plate in the Peru-Chile Trench. Volcanic activity is localized in four major volcanic belts, the Northern Volcanic Zone, the Central Volcanic Zone (CVZ), Southern Volcanic Zone and the Austral Volcanic Zone; these are separated by belts without volcanic activity. Where volcanic activity occurs, the subduction process releases fluids from the downgoing slab which trigger the formation of melts in the mantle that eventually ascend to the surface and give rise to volcanism. Ojos del Salado is part of the Pacific Ring of Fire.

The CVZ spans Peru, Bolivia, Chile and Argentina and contains about 1,100 recognized volcanoes, many of which are extremely old and are still recognizable owing to the low erosion rates in the region. Apart from stratovolcanoes, the CVZ includes numerous calderas, isolated lava domes and lava flows, maars and pyroclastic cones. Most of the volcanoes are remote and thus constitute a low hazard. Ojos del Salado is part of the CVZ and constitutes its southern boundary. South of the volcano volcanism ceased during the last six million years and until 32° south, subduction takes place at a shallow angle and volcanism is absent in the "Pampean flat-slab". The shallow angle may be a consequence of the subduction of submarine topography, such as the Copiapo Ridge at the northern and of the Juan Fernández Ridge at the southern margin of the gap.

Local 

The basement in the region crops out in the Cordillera Claudio Gay area, and consists of sedimentary rocks of Devonian-Carboniferous age. The rocks are intruded by and covered by granites and rhyolites associated with Permian volcanic rocks and the Choiyoi Group. Oligocene to recent volcanic rocks and volcano-sedimentary formations cover this basement. The topography at Ojos del Salado bears evidence of what may have been past magmatic uplift. Seismic tomography has yielded evidence of a low seismic velocity anomaly underneath the volcano that may constitute the pathway through which water emanating from the downgoing slab rises through the mantle and gives rise to melting.

Volcanism in the region commenced 26 million years ago, when the Farallon Plate broke up and subduction speed increased. Between 8-5 million years ago activity declined in the Maricunga region and increased in the Ojos del Salado region, until Maricunga volcanism ceased 4 million years ago. This shift coincided with a gradual flattening of the subduction process since the Miocene and was accompanied by change in crustal and mantle properties that are reflected in the isotope ratios of erupted volcanic rocks. During the Quaternary, volcanism formed the edifices of Cerro Solo, El Fraile, Incahuasi, El Muerto, El Muertito, Falso Azufre, Nevado San Francisco, Nevado Tres Cruces and Ojos del Salado, which together cover over half of the area. Apart from the large volcanoes, many smaller mafic monogenetic volcanoes developed in the area, especially east of Ojos del Salado. Pleistocene volcanism was limited to the Ojos del Salado area, where recent faulting offset volcanic rocks. The large dimensions of Ojos del Salado indicate that magmatism was focused here.

Composition 

Volcanic rocks erupted by Ojos del Salado form a calc-alkaline potassium-rich suite of dacitic rocks, with occasional andesite and rhyodacite. Earlier in the geological history of the region more mafic magmas also erupted. The rocks contain phenocrysts like augite, biotite, hornblende, hypersthene, opaque minerals, plagioclase, pyroxene and quartz. Magma mixing phenomena produced olivine and pyroxene xenocrysts and amphibole reaction rims.

Climate 

Detailed climate data do not exist for the area. The Puna de Atacama region has an extreme climate with strong wind, high elevation, a dry climate and high insolation; the area is just south of the Arid Diagonal.

Temperatures at lower elevations can exceed  but mean annual temperatures only reach . Winds blow strongest in the afternoon. The winds produce aeolian landforms such as aeolian sediments, dunes, gravel pavements, abraded rocks and megaripples at lower elevations, and redeposit snow.

Annual precipitation consists mostly of hail and snow. Compared to sites farther north falls primarily during winter although snowfall is common in summer. The dry climate prevents the development of substantial glaciers in the region; only farther south at Tronquitos does more extensive glaciation begin although temporary ice and snow accumulations can be mistaken for glaciers.

Vegetation and fauna 

Due to the dry climate, the region is a desert with no vegetation occurring above  elevation. However, lichens and mosses have been found at higher elevations and green growths have been reported from the summit region. , there were no reports of plants in the waterbodies on Ojos del Salado. Salt, acid and cold-tolerant bacteria have been recovered from sediments in the lakes on Ojos del Salado, consistent with microorganism samples from similar dry volcanic environments.

A diverse flora and fauna has been described in the lower elevation regions south-southeast of Ojos del Salado. Birds such as ducks, flamingos and geese and mammals such as guanacos and vicuñas occur in the Santa Rosa-Maricunga-Negro Francisco region. Chinchillas and vicunas live in the valleys south of Ojos del Salado, and have drawn humans to the region. Earwigs have been observed at  elevation.

West of the volcano lies the Nevado Tres Cruces National Park and in 1991/1994 there were plans to make a national park on the Argentine side as well. , the establishment of a "zone of touristic interest" encompassing Ojos del Salado was under discussion in Chile.

Eruption history 

Volcanic activity probably commenced 26 million, 3.3-1.5 million years ago or during the late Pleistocene. The 3.7±0.2 million years old Las Lozas Andesite may have been a precursor of Ojos del Salado. The oldest rocks of Ojos del Salado are 3.5-3.4 million years old dacites in the lower parts of the volcano. Argentine geological maps define a "Ojos del Salado basal complex", which consists of a number of Miocene volcanoes that have erupted andesite and dacite, partially in glacial environments.

The volcano developed in two stages, with the more recent one grown on top of the older. A somma volcano structure may have formed during an eruption that generated the pumice deposits on the lower slopes of the volcano, and there are potential air fall deposits north of it. Ojos del Salado may or may not have produced pyroclastic flows; the neighbouring Nevado Tres Cruces  67,000 years ago produced extensive deposits on, around Ojos del Salado and in the valley between the two volcanoes; these were originally interpreted to have originated at Ojos del Salado. A pyroclastic flow erupted by Ojos del Salado descended the Cazadero valley and constitutes the "El Quemado Ignimbrite". Cerro Solo, whose emplacement was probably accompanied by intense pyroclastic flow activity, and lava domes in the summit region are of Pleistocene age.

Radiometric dating has yielded ages of 1.53 ± 0.13, 1.2 ± 0.3 million and less than one million years ago for rocks in the northwestern part of Ojos del Salado, 1.08 ± 0.09 million years for flows underlying the summit, 1.08 ± 0.04 million years for the northern flank of Ojos del Salado, 700,000±50,000 for its western flank, 450,000±60,000 for El Muerto, 340,000 ± 190,000 years for the summit rocks, and 230,000±40,000 years for El Fraile. Lava flows and a lava dome on the northern flank have yielded ages of 100,000 ± 17,000 and 35,000 years, respectively. The "El Quemado Ignimbrite" may be either 200,000 or less than 50,000 years old. The youngest dates reported are 30,000 years ago.

Holocene and historical activity 

A rhyodacitic eruption was dated with tephrochronology to have occurred 750 ± 250 CE. Many volcanic rocks have a fresh appearance but there is no clear evidence of recent activity.

There are no confirmed historical eruptions and the volcano is presently inactive. In November 1993, observers witnessed ash and steam columns on two separate days but no deformation of the volcano was observed by satellites during this occasion. An ash cloud observed on the June 13, 2015, and which led to a warnings about volcanic ash to aircraft turned out to be wind-blown volcanic ash in the Fiambala valley.

Hazards 

There is no information on volcanic hazards at Ojos del Salado and volcanic hazards in the Central Volcanic Zone are poorly reconnoitered, but a 2018 presentation at the University of Auckland ranked it 14th of 38 Argentine volcanoes and the Chilean geological agency SERNAGEOMIN 75th out of 92, thus as a very low risk volcano. The latter has published hazard maps for the Chilean part of the volcano. Future eruptions would most likely produce lava domes, lava flows and minor explosive activity, and the presence of ice on the mountain makes it a potential source for lahars. Effects would most likely be limited to the direct surroundings of the volcano, such as highway .

Fumarolic activity 

There are fumaroles that emit sulfurous smokes. Fumarolic activity appears to be linked to a rift structure on the volcano. Climbers in 1957 reported that the fumaroles were noisy and the emissions intense enough that with unfavourable winds they could suffocate people. The occurrence of geysers in the summit region has been reported.

Human history 

As Ojos del Salado is hidden behind and nested among many peaks of similar elevation, for centuries travellers and mountaineers paid little attention to the mountain. Its remoteness meant that for a long time, both its elevation and exact topography were unclear. The positions and names of the mountains were frequently confused.

The Inca used the Paso San Francisco as a major crossing of the Andes but there is no evidence of them building any archeological sites on Ojos del Salado even though a number of such sites exist in the surrounding region. The Spanish conquistador Diego de Almagro crossed the Andes at Ojos del Salado but did not mention it. Ojos del Salado is likewise absent from the 1861 plans of William Wheelwright for a railway across Paso San Francisco. The explorer Walter Penck crossed the area in 1912/13 and 1913/14 but did not identify the mountain.

Ascents and debate on elevation 

In 1896, 1897 and 1903 the Chile-Argentina boundary commission identified a peak in the area and named it "Ojos del Salado"; according to a myth their "Ojos del Salado" was a much smaller mountain and the actual Ojos del Salado was their "Peak 'e'". The Polish climbers Justin Wojsznis, Stefan Osiecki, Witold Paryski, Jan Szczepański reached the summit on February 26, 1937 and left a cairn but most of the maps and report they drafted were lost during World War II.

After the Polish expedition, the mountain remained unclimbed, although expeditions went to its lower slopes and sometimes confused other peaks for Ojos del Salado until 1955. In that year an expedition from Tucumán ascended a mountain south of Ojos del Salado, which they mistook for the volcano. They stated that the peak may be higher than Aconcagua, which media reported as if it were proven fact. These measurements set off a debate whether Ojos del Salado was higher than Aconcagua and thus the highest summit of the Western Hemisphere, and drew attention to the mountain. The Chilean party also claimed seeing the Argentine pampa and the Pacific Ocean from the summit. In 1957, the official elevation of Ojos del Salado was  according to Argentina and  according to Chile.

The debate on the elevation and confusion about which mountain was Ojos del Salado and who climbed which peak prompted an expedition by the American Alpine Club in 1956. The expedition was hindered by bad weather conditions and a gust of wind stretching a measurement line may have almost frustrated the goal to determine the summit elevation of Ojos del Salado.

Mountaineering and tourism 

Ojos del Salado and the surrounding mountains draw fewer mountaineers than Aconcagua, with only several hundred climbers every year. Since the 1990s commercial tours have become important facilitators for ascents. The mountain can be ascended from both the Argentine and the Chilean side, but owing to the better logistics most ascents occur from the Chilean side. The high elevation, cold and windy weather and impassable terrain are common challenges for would-be climbers. The mountain is also accessible by vehicle, up to  elevation.

Ascent from the Chilean side is easier as the first refuge can be reached by car, but the actual climb is easier from the Argentine side. A dirt road departing from the  highway to Paso San Francisco heads south to Ojos del Salado, past Refugio Murray to the bivouac Refugio Universidad de Atacama/Jorge Rojas at  elevation, from there a path goes to Refugio Tejos at  elevation and eventually to the summit of Ojos del Salado. From there it continues first up dry valleys to Acqua di Vicuna at  elevation, to the El Arenal plateau at  elevation and eventually along various routes to Ojos del Salado.

Astronomy 

Astronomers have reconnoitered the volcano for the possibility of creating an observatory there. The landforms such as the gullies and crater lakes and their conditions, and climatic conditions around Ojos del Salado have also led researchers to investigate it as a potential analogue to environments on Mars.

See also
 Cerro El Muerto
 Cerro Solo
 Incapillo
 Incahuasi
 Laguna Verde
 List of volcanoes in Argentina
 List of volcanoes in Chile
 Lists of volcanoes
 Llullaillaco
Monte Pissis
 Nevado Tres Cruces
 Tipas
 Volcanic Seven Summits

Notes

References

Sources

Bibliography

External links

 
 Complete description of Ojos del Salado in Andeshandbook
 December 1, 2006, Star Trails at 19,000 Feet - NASA Astronomy Picture of the Day
 Andes information
Ojos del Salado Satellite Elevation Data
 Peak bagger
 Summit post
 Peak list
 Virtual Aerial Video

Stratovolcanoes of Chile
Stratovolcanoes of Argentina
Seven Second Summits
Volcanic Seven Summits
Active volcanoes
Andean Volcanic Belt
Volcanic crater lakes
Volcanoes of Atacama Region
Mountains of Atacama Region
Volcanoes of Catamarca Province
Mountains of Catamarca Province
Atacama Desert
Argentina–Chile border
International mountains of South America
Highest points of countries
Six-thousanders of the Andes
Pleistocene stratovolcanoes
Holocene stratovolcanoes